Anil Vasave (born 2 April 1994) is an Indian mountaineer. He is the first mountaineer from the Tribal community of Maharashtra as well as Nandurbar district to climb Mount Kilimanjaro's peak. He climbed Kilimanjaro on January 26, 2021 at 11:15 am. There he read the Preamble of the Constitution of India.

On 8 July 2021, Anil Vasave has created history by successfully climbing Mount Elbrus, the highest peak in Europe. Anil has become the first tribal mountaineer in the Maharashtra to achieve such a feat. Anil Vasave has been selected for climbing Mount Everest expedition in April 2023.

Summits so far 

 26 January 2021:- Mount Kilimanjaro
 26 January 2022:- Mount Everest Base Camp
 7 August 2021:- Mount Elbrus

Awards 
High Range Book Of World Records

References 

Living people
Indian mountain climbers
Indian summiters of Mount Everest
1994 births
Sportspeople from Mumbai
21st-century Indian people
People from Nandurbar district